Dialectical monism, also known as dualistic monism or monistic dualism, is an ontological position that holds that reality is ultimately a unified whole, distinguishing itself from monism by asserting that this whole necessarily expresses itself in dualistic terms.

Principles 

To establish its premises, dialectical monism may posit a Universal Dialectic, which is seen as the fundamental principle of existence. The concept is similar to that of the Taiji or "Supreme Ultimate" in Taoism, the "Purusha-Prakriti" in Samkhya, and duality-in-unity of Shiva-Shakti in Tantra. Advocates assert that Taoism as well as some forms of Buddhism are based on an approach consistent with or identical to dialectical monism.

Ideas relating to "teleological evolution" are important in some progressive interpretations of dialectical monism. However, this element has not always been present historically, and is generally not present in contemporary dialectical monisms such as Taoism. It is important to note that teleological tendencies in dialectical monism can significantly differ from other variants of teleology if dialectical progression is linked to materialism, because such an interpretation is a naturalistic progression rather than a result of design or consciousness. However, non-materialistic philosophies exist that also are dialectical monisms, such as Actual Idealism.

Some variants of dialectical monism adhere to the view that all conditions exist at all times in unity, and our consciousness separates them into dualistic forms. Other views maintain that the nature of dialectical synthesis dictates that the flow of change will tend toward a "spiral-shaped progression" rather than a perpetual non-progressive (repetitive) circling of history. For these dialectical monists, this explains the fact of physical self-organization in Nature, as well as the observed tendency for human societies to achieve gradual "progress" over time. These teleological variants may be referred to as "progressive dialectical monism."

As a monism, dialectical monism is opposed to traditional dualism despite its emphasis on "twoness." In dialectical monism, the appearance of duality is seen as arising from the mind's need to impose divisions and boundaries upon an essentially unified whole. Thus, for the dialectical monist, reality is ultimately one but can only be experienced in terms of division.

Furthermore, dialectical monism might also be termed "plural monism," for it recognizes the dependently originated existence of a multiplicity of entities, which Taoism calls "the ten thousand things." Dialectical monism does not deny that the plurality of things in existence are "real," but points out that physical reality itself is mind-dependent. (see Taoism and Zen).

History 

Dialectical monism has been mentioned in Western literature, although infrequently. Jean-Paul Sartre used the term on at least one occasion, in his Critique of Dialectical Reason. Sartre may have used the term "dialectical monism" when inferring what he saw as absurd in the dogma of a non-dualistic interpretation of the dialectic, in which any oppositional view point was claimed to be non-dialectical rather than part of the dialectic itself.

Although the term has never been used outside the West, advocates maintain that dialectical monism has a much greater presence in Eastern traditions. A wide number of Taoist sources are cited, especially those that relate to the Taiji or yin and yang concepts. In addition, several Buddhist works are seen as containing strong elements of dialectical monism.

Buddhist influences 

The Heart Sutra provides a notable expression of dialectical monism:

"Form is emptiness; emptiness also is form. Emptiness is no other than form; form is no other than emptiness."

However, it is sometimes held that the Buddhist elements of dialectical monism are more accurately characterized as non-dualistic since they deny any fundamental sort of creative principle or "one thing," such as that posited by dialectical monism. See the Buddhist philosophy of emptiness.

In response, dialectical monists might reply that theirs is a "positive expression of nondualism," as opposed to the "negative" expression implied by the qualifier non in nondualism.

Nagarjuna, principal developer of the emptiness doctrine in Buddhism, had a perspective consistent with a broad dialectical monism that was based on the following statement attributed to the Buddha:

"By and large, Kaccayana, this world is supported by a polarity, that of existence and non-existence. But when one sees the origination of the world as it actually is with right discernment, 'non-existence' with reference to the world does not occur to one. When one sees the cessation of the world as it actually is with right discernment, 'existence' with reference to the world does not occur to one."
 - Saṃyutta Nikāya 12:15

Western influences

Pre-Socratic 

Heraclitus is a notable early exception to the Eastern monopoly on dialectical monism:

"By cosmic rule, as day yields night, so winter summer, war peace, plenty famine. All things change. Fire penetrates the lump of myrrh, until the joining bodies die and rise again in smoke called incense." (fragment 36) 
"Men do not know how that which is drawn in different directions harmonises with itself. The harmonious structure of the world depends upon opposite tension like that of the bow and the lyre."

Post-Socratic 
One must realize that war is shared and Conflict is Justice, and that all things come to pass in accordance with conflict.— Cited by Origen, Contra Celsum VI.28 (Diels-Kranz fragment 80)
<blockquote>The way up and down are the same.— Cited by Hippolytus of Rome, Refutatio Omnium Haeresium IX.10.4 (Diels-Kranz fragment 60)</blockquote>
It is wise, not listening to me but to the report (λόγος), to agree that all things are one.— Cited by Hippolytus, Refutatio IX.9.1 (Diels-Kranz fragment 50)

 Parallels in Aztec philosophy 

In its article on Aztec philosophy, the Internet Encyclopedia of Philosophy describes Aztec (Nahua) metaphysics as a form of dialectical monism:

Although essentially processive and devoid of any permanent order, the ceaseless becoming of the cosmos is nevertheless characterized by an overarching balance, rhythm, and regularity: one provided by and constituted by teotl... Dialectical polar monism holds that: (1) the cosmos and its contents are substantively and formally identical with teotl; and (2) teotl presents itself primarily as the ceaseless, cyclical oscillation of polar yet complementary opposites.
Teotl's process presents itself in multiple aspects, preeminent among which is duality. This duality takes the form of the endless opposition of contrary yet mutually interdependent and mutually complementary polarities that divide, alternately dominate, and explain the diversity, movement, and momentary arrangement of the universe. These include: being and not-being, order and disorder, life and death, light and darkness, masculine and feminine, dry and wet, hot and cold, and active and passive. Life and death, for example, are mutually arising, interdependent, and complementary aspects of one and the same process.

 Dao De Jing references 

Chapter 42 of the Dao De Jing outlines a number-based cosmology that may be consistent with dialectical monism:

"The Tao produced One; One produced Two; Two produced Three; Three produced All things. All things leave behind them the Obscurity (out of which they have come), and go forward to embrace the Brightness (into which they have emerged), while they are harmonised by the Breath of Vacancy."
"What men dislike is to be orphans, to have little virtue, to be as carriages without naves; and yet these are the designations kings and princes use for themselves. So it is that some things are increased by being diminished, and others are diminished by being increased."

Several other chapters (including Chapter 1) make reference to concepts consistent with dialectical monism.

 Contemporary references 

 Eastern Philosophy 

"Really, the fundamental, ultimate mystery - the only thing you need to know to understand the deepest metaphysical secrets - is this: that for every outside there is an inside and for every inside there is an outside, and although they are different, they go together." 
— Alan Watts

 Shakespeare 

"... for there is nothing either good or bad, but thinking makes it so." 
— William Shakespeare, Hamlet. Act II, scene ii 245As Shakespeare in several places borrows directly from the Bible, he may have been paraphrasing Saint Paul:"I am convinced, being fully persuaded in the Lord Jesus, that nothing is unclean in itself. But if anyone regards something as unclean, then for that person it is unclean." Romans 14:14

 Thelema 

In a more contemporary area, the idea of dialectical monism is expressed in the central book of Thelema, Liber AL vel Legis:

"None... and two. For I am divided for love's sake, for the chance of union. This is the creation of the world, that the pain of division is as nothing, and the joy of dissolution all."
— Liber AL vel Legis, ch. 1, verses 28-30

"The world exists as two, for only so can there be known the Joy of Love, whereby are Two made One. Aught that is One is alone, and has little pain in making itself two, that it may know itself, and love itself, and rejoice therein."
— Aleister Crowley, "The Comment Called D"

In Thelema, the transcendent unity is often referred to as "None" or "Nothing":

"By Light shall ye look upon yourselves, and behold All Things that are in Truth One Thing only, whose name hath been called No Thing..."
—Aleister Crowley, De Lege Libellum

"... let it be ever thus; that men speak not of Thee as One but as None; and let them speak not of thee at all, since thou art continuous!"
—Liber AL vel Legis, ch. 1, verse 27

 Sartre on Marxism 

"It is dualist because it is monist. Marx’s ontological monism consisted in affirming the irreducibility of Being to thought, and, at the same time, in reintegrating thoughts with the real as a particular form of human activity." 

—Jean-Paul Sartre, Critique of Dialectical Reason, Vol. 1. Theory of Practical Ensembles

In Sartre's seminal work, the Critique of Dialectical Reason'', it is shown how the essential dualism of Marx corresponds to a heightened synthesis, referring to totality, which is the monism that grounds the theses and antitheses of Marxism.

Native American 

"The Universe, which controls all life, has a female and male balance that prevalent throughout our Sacred Grandmother, the Earth. This balance has to be acknowledged and become the determining factor in all of one’s decisions, be they spiritual, social, healthful, educational or economical." 
—Russell Means

See also 

 Monism
 Dialectics
 Actual Idealism
 Dialectical materialism
 Dualism
 Heraclitus
 Nondualism
 Relativism
 Taoism
 Wave–particle duality
 Unity of opposites

Notes

References

External links 

 Further reading at books.google.com
 Dialectical Monism at www.naturyl.humanists.net
 Yin-Yang Dialectical Monism

Dialectic
Monism
Metaphysics of religion
Theory of mind
Jean-Paul Sartre